Devils 'n Darlins is the debut studio album by American rock band Ed Roland and the Sweet Tea Project.

Track listing

2013 debut albums
429 Records albums
Albums produced by Ed Roland
Ed Roland and the Sweet Tea Project albums